Suburban Commando is a 1991 American science fiction action comedy film directed by Burt Kennedy, produced by Howard Gottfried, and written by Frank Cappello. The film stars Hulk Hogan, Christopher Lloyd, Shelley Duvall, and Larry Miller. Additionally, a young Elisabeth Moss briefly appears in her film debut.

The film was originally titled Urban Commando, and was intended for Danny DeVito and Arnold Schwarzenegger. When these two opted to make Twins (1988), the script was bought by New Line Cinema as the follow-up to another Hulk Hogan film, No Holds Barred.

Plot
Interstellar warrior Shep Ramsey (Hulk Hogan) is on a mission to capture intergalactic despot General Suitor (William Ball). The general has kidnapped President Hashina, the ruler of an entire planet. Shep boards Suitor's flagship but is unable to rescue Hashina, who is killed by Suitor. Wounded by Hashina in the process, Suitor transforms into a berserk reptilian creature (Frank Welker). Shep barely escapes, but is able to blow up the ship as he does so.

Due to his failure to save the President, Shep's superior officer suggests that he is "stressed out" and should take a vacation. Annoyed, Shep accidentally smashes his control systems and is forced to crash land on Earth, where he realizes he will have to stay until his spaceship repairs itself. Shep has little knowledge of Earth's customs, and his temper and sense of justice cause problems with everyone he meets, especially a mime artist he tries to help in various comical fashions, such as freeing him from his "invisible box".

Charlie Wilcox (Christopher Lloyd) is a weak-willed architect working for the fawning and hypocritical Adrian Beltz (Larry Miller). His wife Jenny (Shelley Duvall) unsuccessfully encourages him to stand up for himself and tells Charlie to ask Beltz for a raise since the bills are now very expensive. Charlie goes to Beltz to ask for a raise, but he chickens out. In order to help out financially, she rents out Charlie's hobby shed as a vacation cabin, which Shep leases. Shep's appearance and behavior make Charlie nervous, and he begins to spy on his guest. He soon discovers Shep's advanced equipment and begins experimenting with it, not knowing that the power sources are traceable and its whereabouts tracked by Suitor's men. They send a pair of intergalactic bounty hunters after Shep. Shep also requires several rare crystals to fix his ship, the closest samples of which can be found in Beltz's office. Charlie helps Shep get into his boss's office during a company party before the bounty hunters corner them. After winning a furious fight, Shep and Charlie head home to repair the ship.

After the bounty hunters' defeat, Suitor, who has escaped the destruction of his ship, arrives on Earth. He takes Charlie's family hostage, forcing Charlie to lead him to Shep. To protect Charlie and his family, Shep decides to use a "lose to win" tactic by setting his ship to self-destruct and surrendering to Suitor, in exchange for releasing the Wilcox family. Suitor then begins torturing Shep, enjoying himself before he intends to kill the warrior. Finding his courage, Charlie returns to help Shep and injures Suitor, who then turns into his monstrous form. Physically outmatched, Shep stuns Suitor with some electrical wires in front of a fuse box and he and Charlie manage to escape the ship's explosion, which destroys Suitor for good.

Shep leaves Earth using the bounty hunters' ship. He takes Beltz's secretary, Margie, with him, hoping for a quiet family life. Charlie, however, has become bolder from his experiences; he appears in Beltz's office the following morning, shouting at his boss in front of witnesses, and finally quits his thankless job. Later, Charlie solves his final problem by using one of Shep's weapons to destroy an annoying set of traffic lights that never changed at the right time, receiving cheers from the other motorists.

Cast

 Hulk Hogan as Shep Ramsey
 Christopher Lloyd as Charlie Wilcox
 Shelley Duvall as Jenny Wilcox
 Michael Faustino as Mark Wilcox
 Laura Mooney as Theresa Wilcox
 Larry Miller as Adrian Beltz
 Dennis Burkley as Deak
 Branscombe Richmond as Biker
 William Ball as General Suitor; his mutant form is played by Vincent Hammond, Frank Welker provided the uncredited vocals for Suitor's true form as aforementioned
 Jack Elam as Colonel Dustin "Dusty" McHowell
 Elisabeth Moss as Little Girl
 Jo Ann Dearing as Margie Tanen
 Roy Dotrice as Zanuck
 Tony Longo as Knuckles
 Mark Calaway as Hutch

Reception

Box office
The film opened with $1.9 million.  Overall, the film grossed a total of $8,002,361 in the United States. With a budget of $11 million, the film was a commercial failure.

Critical response
On Rotten Tomatoes the film has an approval rating of 15%  based on 13 reviews.

Roger Ebert noted, "This is the second feature starring Hulk Hogan, the man who looks like a comic strip hero. Hogan's range is limited, but not as limited as the movies he's appeared in. Despite the fact that his public image is often aimed at children - there's a whole line of Hulk Hogan toys - his first film, 'No Holds Barred' (1989) was surprisingly violent, sexist and blood-soaked. Now here's 'Suburban Commando,' which is at least innocuous, but which gives the Hulkster so little to do that his fans may wonder why he bothered." Michael Wilmington opened his review for it in the Los Angeles Times by saying that all the main personnel were "likeable" but that "all that likability combined, or even cubed, doesn't create any pressing reason to pay admission to "Suburban Commando" - unless you're an obsessed movie completist or a sudden cloudburst drives you to shelter." Stephen Holden of The New York Times', noted that despite the fact that it "has little narrative continuity, it is well paced and has an amusingly sour performance by Larry Miller as the kind of boss you love to hate."

References

External links
 
 
 
 
 

1991 films
1991 science fiction films
1991 action comedy films
1990s American films
1990s children's comedy films
1990s English-language films
1990s science fiction action films
1990s science fiction comedy films
American action comedy films
American children's comedy films
American science fiction action films
American science fiction comedy films
American space adventure films
Films directed by Burt Kennedy
Films scored by David Michael Frank
Internet memes
New Line Cinema films